V-1 was a South Korean music television program that aired as a pilot program for Chuseok on tvN, on September 13–15, 2019 at 17:40 (KST). It was hosted by Kang Ho-dong.

Program
The program name "V-1" is a combination of "V" in Vocal and "1" in No.1. The purpose of this program is to select the Vocal Queen among the girl group members. Registration for the program was open to all girl group members, regardless of their positions in their groups. The production team then selected 24 girl group members and revealed their audition clips. The public may vote for their top 5 favourite girl group members on V-1's official website. Only the top 12 girl group members in votes would progress and perform on the show.

In the 1st and 2nd episodes, there would be 6 match-ups in Round 1. The winner of each match-up would move on to Round 2, through the voting of the 101 members of the VIP voting squad, which includes JeA (Brown Eyed Girls), Hyun Woo, Car, the Garden and fashion creative director Yang Ji-hye.

In the 3rd episode, Round 2 and the final round would be held. In Round 2, the 6 winning contestants from Round 1 would be split into 2 groups of 3 through random drawing of lots. The winner from each group would advance to the final round. The final winner of this series wins ₩10,000,000.

Contestants

Final contestants

Episodes
Episode 1 (September 13, 2019)

Episode 2 (September 14, 2019)

Episode 3 (September 15, 2019)

Ratings

References

South Korean music television shows
South Korean reality television series
TVN (South Korean TV channel) original programming
2019 South Korean television series debuts
2019 South Korean television series endings